In mathematics, the Jessen–Wintner theorem, introduced by ,  asserts that a random variable of Jessen–Wintner type, meaning the sum of an almost surely convergent series of independent discrete random variables, is of pure type.

References

Probability theorems